Runway is a 2004 Indian Malayalam-language action thriller film directed by Joshiy and written by Udayakrishna and Siby K. Thomas. It stars Dileep, Indrajith Sukumaran, Murali, Harisree Ashokan, and Kavya Madhavan. The film revolves around Unni (Dileep) who due to financial problems becomes the renowned smuggler, Valayar Paramasivam, in the Kerala-Tamil Nadu border check-post, Walayar. He works for a mafia king-pin Bhai (Murali).

Plot
The film begins when Gopika and her father move into a house where Bharathiyamma stays with her two children, Balu Damodar and Ambili. Bharathiyamma has one more elder son Unni Damodar who works in Dubai. Unni tells his family that he is working in Gulf but in reality he runs illegal spirit business with Chandy Bhai along with Achayan and Achuvettan in Valayar.

He accepts a four-year imprisonment but actually the accused was Bhai. Unni, however confesses what he does, to Gopika whom his mother is insistent that he should marry her. After leaving the jail Paramasivam realizes that Bhai has fallen into a huge debt because of the cheating of Chinnadan Varkey and his sons. He then goes to Valayar and thus saves Bhai and his family from debt with his wicked mind and tricks. He again rules spirit deals in Valayar area pulling the Chinnadans into trouble. Things change when Balu becomes a police officer. He is posted in Valayar area, where Unni and Bhai rule .

In Valayar, Balu tries his level best to catch Valayar Paramasivam but does not know that it is none other than his brother; and fails in mind game played by Unni. This makes Bhai angry with Balu. But Paramasivam tells him to forgive Balu because he was his brother. In the meantime, Unni's family discovers that he himself is Paramsivam after Gopika's uncle Divakaran, a jail guard in the jail where he was imprisoned visits them and he is ousted from his family. Later, Chinnadan kills Bhai's only son Jerry and blames Balu as the real killer. This made Bhai very desperate and wants to kill Balu. Bhai kidnaps him. On knowing this, Paramasivam goes to save Balu and informs Bhai that the actual killer was SP by identifying the ring marks in Jerry's face.

Paramasivam then confesses him that Bhai's Paramasivam will not lie to Bhai. After realizing the innocence of Balu, Bhai and Paramasivam plans to kill the Chinnadans by releasing gas and spirit into their house after locking all the doors and sending a toy plane which blasts when functioned switch is pressed. The film moves to the climax, where it is shown that Paramasivam gets acquitted from all their cases since Bhai has pleaded guilty to all the crimes. He wants Paramasivam to return as Unni to his family and lead a normal life with them.

Cast 
 Dileep as Unni Damodhar a.k.a. Valayar Paramasivam
 Indrajith as SI Balu Damodhar; Unni's brother
 Murali as Bhai/Chandy, a mafia kingpin
 Harisree Ashokan as Porinju; Unni's jailmate and friend
 Kavya Madhavan as Gopika
 Kaviyoor Ponnamma as Bharathi Amma; Unni, Ambili and Balu's mother
 Cochin Haneefa as Jailor Divakaran, Gopika's uncle
 Kalasala Babu as Chinnadan Varkey
 Riyaz Khan as Chinnadan Babu, Chinnadan Varkey's son
 Oduvil Unnikrishnan as Krishnan Nair, Gopika's father
 Mohan Jose as Achuvettan, Paramasivam's assistant
 Santhosh as Achayan, Paramasivam's assistant
 Mithun Ramesh as Johnny, Chandy's son
 Vishnu Prasad as Sajan, Varkey's eldest son
 Abdul Majeed as Pothen, Varkey's brother
 Shammi Thilakan as SP Viswanathan IPS
 Jagathy Sreekumar as Kariyachan
 Suja Karthika as Ambili; Unni and Balu's sister
 P.C George as Superintendent of Police-Prisons
 Abraham Koshy as Excise Officer
 Chali Pala as Police Inspector Kannan
 Bhavana in a guest appearance in Osalama song
 Ambika Mohan as Chandy's wife
 Kalabhavan Shajohn as Pandyan
 Nandu Poduval as Ramankutty, Bhai Gang member
 Sudheer Sukumaran as Mathai, Varkey's son

Music 

Runway consists of 6 songs,  including one instrumental version, were composed by Suresh Peters and the Original background music is scored by S. P. Venkatesh.All the lyrics were penned by Gireesh Puthenchery.

Remake
The film was remade in Telugu as Nayakudu with Rajasekhar.

Sequel
In 2016, it was announced by Dileep that a sequel is in works, titled Valayar Paramasivam.

Box office
The film was blockbuster .

References

External links
 

2004 films
2000s Malayalam-language films
Malayalam films remade in other languages
Films scored by Suresh Peters
Indian gangster films
Indian family films
Indian action thriller films
Films shot in Palakkad
Films directed by Joshiy